John William Russell (born January 5, 1961) is an American former catcher and outfielder in Major League Baseball (MLB), and former manager of the Pittsburgh Pirates. He played 10 seasons from 1984 to 1993 with the Philadelphia Phillies, Atlanta Braves and Texas Rangers, mostly as a platoon or reserve player.

Playing career
Born in Oklahoma City, Russell attended Norman High School in Norman, Oklahoma, and played college baseball for the University of Oklahoma after being selected by the Montreal Expos in the 4th round (88th overall) of the 1979 MLB Draft. In 1982 he was selected by the Phillies in the 1st round and the 13th overall pick in the draft. In May 1984, Russell was one of three ejections in a minor league game. On May 27, 1984, Portland Beavers manager Lee Elia, angered over a call, was ejected by umpire Pam Potesma. Elia tossed a folding chair onto the field before leaving the dugout. Beavers bat boy Sam Morris refused instructions of Potesma to remove the chair and the bat boy himself was ejected. John Russell sprinted in from the outfield to come to the defense of the fourteen year old Morris and Russell himself was ejected for his efforts. Both Elia and Russell were fined by the league $25, as was standard for players and coaches ejected from a minor league game. An exception was made for the bat boy and he was not fined. Russell made his major league debut with the Phillies on June 22, and stayed with the team through the 1988 season. After spending most of his first two seasons as a backup left fielder, he was the team's principal catcher in 1986 due to Darren Daulton suffering a year-ending injury, and batted .241 with 13 home runs and 60 runs batted in. It was the Phillies' only winning season in his five years with the team, but they finished a distant second place in the division behind division rival and eventual champion New York Mets. He saw very little playing time in the next two years. He spent 1989 with the Braves, who purchased his contract in spring training. When the Braves released him at the beginning of the 1990 season he moved on to the Rangers, for whom he played until his retirement in 1993.  While with the Rangers he caught Nolan Ryan's 6th career no-hitter on June 11, 1990.  He ended his career with a .225 batting average, 34 home runs and 129 RBI in 448 games.

Coaching career

Early positions
Upon his retirement as a player, he became a minor league manager for the Minnesota Twins. In 1999 he was named as the best Double-A managerial prospect by Baseball America. He left the Twins organization after the 2000 season; he interviewed with the Phillies for their vacant managerial spot, but the job went to Larry Bowa. Eventually he re-joined the Minnesota Twins as manager of the Edmonton Trappers. In 2002 Russell led Edmonton to a Pacific Coast League title, and was again honored by Baseball America, being named the best managerial prospect in the minors. The following year he was named the Pirates third-base coach, a job he held from 2003 to 2005. Russell was unpopular among some Pirates fans because of the frequency of runners he waved home that were thrown out at the plate.  He was eventually fired, along with the rest of Lloyd McClendon's coaching staff, in 2005. After being fired Russell was named as manager of the Phillies AAA team, the Scranton/Wilkes-Barre Red Barons, a position he held through 2006, until the Phillies switched affiliates to the Ottawa Lynx in 2007, with Russell still at the helm.

Pittsburgh Pirates manager
Prior to the 2007 season, Russell interviewed for the Texas Rangers managerial vacancy; the position ultimately went to longtime Oakland A's third-base coach Ron Washington.
On November 5, he was introduced as the Pirates manager, replacing Jim Tracy. In February 2009, the Pirates extended his contract through the 2010 season. During the 2010 season, the Pirates announced that Russell's contract had been extended through the 2011 season; though the extension occurred during the previous off season, the Pirates waited until June to announce the new contract, a move unpopular with many fans. On October 4, 2010, Russell was fired as the Pirates manager after a 105-loss season and an overall record of 186–299.

Baltimore Orioles coach
On November 15, 2010, Russell was hired as the third base coach of the Baltimore Orioles. Due to ongoing knee issues, he traded coaching positions with Willie Randolph and became Bench Coach in June 2011. Russell's contract expired after the 2018 season.

Managerial record

Personal life
Russell is married to wife Jamie. He has three sons: Stone, Brooks and Steel. The Orioles drafted Steel Russell in 2012. He spent parts of four seasons in the Orioles system and one with the Perth Heat of the Australian Baseball League.

References

External links

1961 births
Living people
Major League Baseball catchers
Philadelphia Phillies players
Atlanta Braves players
Texas Rangers players
Reading Phillies players
Portland Beavers players
Maine Guides players
Oklahoma City 89ers players
Tulsa Drillers players
Louisville Redbirds players
Baseball players from Oklahoma
Baseball managers
Pittsburgh Pirates coaches
Pittsburgh Pirates managers
Baltimore Orioles coaches
Oklahoma Sooners baseball players
Sportspeople from Oklahoma City
World Games gold medalists
Competitors at the 1981 World Games
Anchorage Glacier Pilots players
American expatriate baseball people in Venezuela